"Tribute to a Woman" is a song by American R&B singer Ginuwine. It was co-written and produced by Troy Oliver along with Cory Rooney for his studio third album The Life (2001). The song was released as the album's fourth and final single and reached number 61 on the US Hot R&B/Hip-Hop Songs chart.

Background
"Tribute to a Woman" was written by Ginuwine and Troy Oliver, while production was helmed by Oliver along with Cory Rooney. In a 2016 interview, Ginuwine commented on the song: "I love that song. Everybody tells me about that song, especially the women. I just felt women needed a song like that. It was sort of like "Dear Mama" by 2Pac. When I made that one, I was really trying to get all of the power women like Oprah. It didn’t work out, but the thought was there because I was thinking about it."

Track listing

Credits and personnel
Credits lifted from the liner notes of The Life.

Ginuwine – executive producer, vocals, writer
Troy Oliver – producer, writer
Cory Rooney – producer
Vlad the Impaler – mastering

Charts

References	
	
	

2002 singles
Ginuwine songs
Songs written by Troy Oliver
Songs written by Ginuwine
Song recordings produced by Troy Oliver